Kim Sa-nee (Hangul: 김사니, Hanja: 金사니; born 21 June 1981, Seoul) is a South Korean volleyball player. 

She played for the South Korea women's national volleyball team. She participated in the 2001 FIVB World Grand Prix.
She was part of the silver medal winning team at the 2010 Asian Games.  She has also twice competed with the South Korean team at the Olympics, finishing in fifth in 2004, and fourth in 2012.

Others
On November 18, suspicions arose that Sa-nee, a coach of Hwaseong IBK at the time, had left the team without permission, which happened soon after Cho Song-hwa had done the same. The club explained her absence saying that she was taking a break, but shortly after, reports of an unauthorized departure appeared, causing consternation among fans. The incident represented the second time in the history of professional sports in Korea that a coach, and not a player, left a team without permission. Cho Song-hwa and Kim Sa-nee's situation was exactly the same, and Sa-nee's alleged, "It's a misunderstanding because I took a vacation.", failed to provide calm.

However, at around 3:30 p.m. on November 21, the situation took a turn for the worst. The club reportedly replaced head coach Seo Nam-won and general manager Yoon Jae-seop, thereby alluding that Sa-nee's rebellion had been successful. The club further said that Sa-nee's resignation had been rejected and appealed for efforts to normalize the team. With no coach at the helm, it then became apparent that Kim Sa-nee was the candidate to ascend to the head coach position she was said to have wanted in the first place.

The turn of events caused a big controversy in Korean volleyball and as of November 30, coaches from all the other six women's teams took a united stance and refused to shake hands with Sa-nee.

Eventually, ahead of the match against Korea Expressway Corporation on December 2, Kim Sa-nee announced that she would step down as acting head coach after the match.

References

1981 births
Living people
South Korean women's volleyball players
Asian Games medalists in volleyball
Volleyball players at the 2002 Asian Games
Volleyball players at the 2006 Asian Games
Volleyball players at the 2010 Asian Games
Volleyball players at the 2004 Summer Olympics
Volleyball players at the 2012 Summer Olympics
Olympic volleyball players of South Korea
Asian Games silver medalists for South Korea
Medalists at the 2002 Asian Games
Medalists at the 2010 Asian Games